The DHR D Class was a  gauge  Garratt-type articulated steam locomotive used on the Darjeeling Himalayan Railway (DHR) in West Bengal, India.

Service history
The sole member of the class was built by Beyer, Peacock and Company in 1910, and entered service the following year, as no. 31 in the DHR fleet.  Its basic dimensions were designed to be roughly equivalent to those of two of the DHR's existing B Class  engines, with the intention that it would produce approximately double the power of those engines.  However, in practice it was only able to haul 65% more load than a single B Class unit.

Although the DHR did not acquire any further articulated locomotives, no. 31 remained in service until November 1954.

See also

Rail transport in India#History
Indian Railways
Locomotives of India
Rail transport in India

References

Notes

Bibliography

External links

Beyer, Peacock locomotives
Railway locomotives introduced in 1911
Steam locomotives of India
0-4-0+0-4-0 locomotives
2 ft gauge locomotives
Scrapped locomotives
Garratt locomotives
Individual locomotives